Roselyn Doria (born September 2, 1996) is a Filipina volleyball player. She currently plays for the Cignal HD Spikers volleyball team. She is a member of the Philippines women's national volleyball team that competed in the 2019 ASEAN Grand Prix.

Clubs 
  Foton Tornadoes (2017) 
  BaliPure - NU Water Defenders (2018) 
  Cignal HD Spikers (2019-present)

Awards

Individual
 2019 UAAP Season 81 "1st Best Middle Blocker"
 2019 Philippine Superliga Invitational Cup "2nd Best Middle Blocker"
 2022 Premier Volleyball League Open Conference "1st Best Middle Blocker"
 2022 Premier Volleyball League Reinforced Conference "2nd Best Middle Blocker"

Collegiate
 2014-15 UAAP Season 77 volleyball tournaments  -  - Bronze medal, with NU Lady Bulldogs
 2015 Shakey's V-League 12th Season Collegiate Conference -  - Champion, with NU Lady Bulldogs
 2016 Shakey's V-League 13th Season Collegiate Conference -  - Champion, with NU Lady Bulldogs
 2017 Premier Volleyball League 1st Season Collegiate Conference -  - Champion, with NU Lady Bulldogs

Club
 2019 PSL All-Filipino Conference  -  - Runner-up, with Cignal HD Spikers
 2019 PSL Invitational Cup  -  - Bronze medal, with Cignal HD Spikers
 2022 PVL Open Conference  -  - Bronze medal, with Cignal HD Spikers
 2022 PVL Invitational Conference  -  - Bronze medal, with Cignal HD Spikers
 2022 PVL Reinforced Conference  -  - Runner-up, with Cignal HD Spikers

National team
 2019 ASEAN Grand Prix - First Leg -  - Bronze medal
 2019 ASEAN Grand Prix - Second Leg -  - Bronze medal

References 

1996 births
People from Pangasinan
National University (Philippines) alumni
University Athletic Association of the Philippines volleyball players
Living people
Sportspeople from Pangasinan
Philippines women's international volleyball players
Filipino women's volleyball players
Middle blockers
21st-century Filipino women